Pandu Pandoru Rajakumari is a 1992 Malayalam film directed by Viji Thampi, with Jagadish, Anju, Siddique and Nedumudi Venu.

Plot
Traumatized by deaths of her mother and husband, Devu was taken by her father-in-law Balan Nambiar. They went to a hotel in Ooty. One day, Appukuttan Pillai got job as waiter, witnessed an accident and Devu was mentally disturbed. Appu was actually a music student of her late mother, who knew her for years.  Balan asked him to take care of Devu; soon Appu starts having feelings of childhood love, despite her being a widow.

Cast
Jagadish... Appukuttan Pillai
Nedumudi Venu... Balan Nambiar
Anju... Devu
Siddique... Johnson
Sivaranjini... Alice
Sainuddin... Velu
Premkumar... Pushpan
Kunchan... Suku
Oduvil Unnikrishnan... Parameswara Kaimal
Manoj K. Jayan... Vishnu
Narendra Prasad... Dr. Robert Franklin D'Souza
Shanthi Krishna... Devayani
Thodupuzha Vasanthi... Ammini
Jagannatha Varma... Thampuran
Kollam Thulasi... Arumugham Vadivelan

External links
 
 https://web.archive.org/web/20120612030022/http://popcorn.oneindia.in/title/8746/pandu-pandoru-rajakumari.html

1990s Malayalam-language films
1990s romance films
1992 films
Films directed by Viji Thampi